Stade Jean-Antoine Moueix is a multi-use stadium in Libourne, France.  It is currently used mostly for football matches and is the home stadium of FC Libourne-Saint-Seurin. The stadium is able to hold 8,500 people.

References

Jean-Antoine Moueix
FC Libourne
Sports venues in Gironde
Sports venues completed in 1965
1965 establishments in France